Lily Inge Newmark (born 24 May 1994) is an actress and former model. She is best known for her roles in the film Pin Cushion (2017), the Netflix series Sex Education (2019–2020) and Cursed (2020), and the Sky One series Temple (2019–).

Early life
Born in Camberwell, South London, Newmark is one of five children of former Conservative MP Brooks Newmark and artist Lucy Keegan. Her maternal aunt is the actress Rose Keegan.

Newmark attended school in Sydenham until the age of 12 when her family moved to Central London and she transferred to Francis Holland School in Sloane Square. She said she "much preferred" South London and found Chelsea to be too much of a bubble. She went on to graduate with a Bachelor of Arts in Acting and Contemporary Theatre from East 15 Acting School in 2016.

Career
Newmark began her career by appearing in amateur independent films and in music videos for artists, including DISCIPLΞS, Rejjie Snow and Real Lies. She was scouted by First Model Management and worked professionally as a fashion model for several years. As a model her work included campaigns for Zandra Rhodes and Chanel; and editorials for Vice Magazine and Wonderland Magazine

In her final year at drama school, Newmark was cast in a small recurring role in the NBC television series Emerald City. She was then cast in the leading role of Iona in the British independent film Pin Cushion, for which she was nominated for Most Promising Newcomer at the British Independent Film Awards. She went on to play supporting roles in various film and television productions including Juliet, Naked (2018), Solo: A Star Wars Story (2018), Les Misérables (2019), Born a King (2019), Balance, Not Symmetry (2019), Sex Education (2019–2020), Cursed (2020), Misbehaviour (2020), and Temple (2019).

Personal life
Newmark lives in the Victoria area of London. She voted Liberal Democrat in 2017, saying she went with her "gut instinct".

Filmography

Film

Television

References

External links
 

Living people
1994 births
Actresses from London
Alumni of East 15 Acting School
English film actresses
English people of American-Jewish descent
British people of Irish descent
English people of Irish descent
English television actresses
Jewish English actresses
Liberal Democrats (UK) people
People educated at Francis Holland School
People from Camberwell